Harper University Hospital is one of eight hospitals and institutes that compose the Detroit Medical Center. Harper offers services in a broad range of clinical areas, including cardiology, neurology, neurosurgery, organ transplant, plastic surgery, general surgery, bariatric (weight loss surgery) endocrinology and sleep disorders.

History
Established in 1863, Harper is among the oldest U.S. medical teaching institutions.

Nursing became professionalized in the late 19th century, opening a new middle-class career for talented young women of all social backgrounds. The Harper Hospital School of Nursing, begun in 1884, was a national leader. Its graduates worked at the hospital and also in institutions, public health services, as private duty nurses, and volunteered for duty at military hospitals during the Spanish–American War and the two world wars.

World War I
Base Hospital No. 17 was organized at Harper Hospital in September 1916, and was mobilized on June 28, 1917. On July 3, 1917, the organization was transferred to Allentown, Pennsylvania, leaving there July 11, for New York City, where it embarked on the Mongolia and sailed July 13, 1917. It arrived at Southampton, England on July 24, by way of Plymouth, England, and at Le Havre, France on July 25, 1917. It remained at Le Havre until July 28, when it proceeded by rail to its final destination, Dijon, Department Cote D'or, in the advance section, arriving there July 29, 1917.

Base Hospital No. 17 was the first American organization to arrive at that station, where it functioned as an independent hospital, until January 8, 1919. At Dijon the unit was assigned the Hospital St. Ignace (French Auxiliary Hospital No. 77), then operated by the French Army. The French had about 230 patients in the hospital when the unit arrived, the evacuation of which was not completed until August 18, 1917. It began receiving American patients on August 21, 1917, but the hospital was not officially turned over to the commanding officer until September 2, 1917. In June 1918, when the capacity of the hospital proved inadequate, a French seminary was taken over at Plombiers, France, about 3½ miles from the main hospital, and was operated as an annex. The seminary was a large stone building, of 800-bed capacity, and was used largely for convalescent and minor surgical cases. Base Hospital No. 17 ceased to function January 8, 1919; the unit sailed from St. Nazaire on April 14, 1919, on the Princess Matoika, arriving at Newport News on April 27, 1919, and was demobilized at Camp Custer in Michigan on May 9, 1919.

First successful open heart surgery
Harper was the site of the world's first successful open-heart operation, using a mechanical heart called the Dodrill-GMR developed by a General Motors engineer with Harper physicians, including Forest Dewey Dodrill. The mechanical blood-pumping machine allowed a human heart to be temporarily stopped and operated on while the machine maintained blood circulation in the patient's body. The successful first surgery occurred on 3 July 1952.

Recent
In 2004, Harper was the first to debut the Intraoperative Magnetic Resonance Imaging (iMRI) system in Michigan. Also in 2004, surgeons at Harper were the first to perform a kidney transplant on an HIV recipient.

The hospital is now staffed by faculty of the Wayne State University School of Medicine.

Rankings and accreditation
Harper is in The Leapfrog Group’s 2008 Top Hospital list for patient quality and safety. The Leapfrog Group rankings are based on a survey conducted at 1,220 hospitals across the country.

Harper University Hospital ranked above the national average in a survey compiled by the Centers for Medicare and Medicaid Services (CMS) and the Federal Department of Health and Human Services. The list included data from 4,807 hospitals across the United States. Of those hospitals, only 38 were ranked above the national average. The results are meant to assist the public in assessing how well their area hospitals care for patients with specific types of medical conditions, including heart failure and heart attacks.

Harper University Hospital has received full approval from the Surgical Review Corporation (SRC) and the American Society for Bariatric Surgery (ASBS) as a Bariatric Center of Excellence. This accreditation recognizes that Harper's bariatric program meets the patient care standards as set forth by the SRC and ASBS.

Hospital rating data from HealthGrades website
The HealthGrades website contains the clinical quality data for Harper University Hospital, as of 2017. For this rating section three different types of data from HealthGrades are presented: clinical quality ratings for twenty-nine inpatient conditions and procedures, thirteen patient safety indicators and the percentage of patients giving the hospital as a 9 or 10 (the two highest possible ratings).

For inpatient conditions and procedures, there are three possible ratings: worse than expected, as expected, better than expected.  For this hospital the data for this category is:
Worse than expected - 5
As expected - 22
Better than expected - 2
For patient safety indicators, there are the same three possible ratings. For this hospital safety indicators were rated as:
Worse than expected - 6
As expected - 7
Better than expected - 0
Percentage of patients rating this hospital as a 9 or 10 - 68%
Percentage of patients who on average rank hospitals as a 9 or 10 - 69%

Cardio Team One
Harper, along with Detroit Receiving Hospital and Sinai-Grace Hospital, is the home of Cardio Team One, a specialized initiative designed to reduce the response time for patients presenting at emergency room with severe cardiac disease.

Gallery

References

External links

 Detroit Medical Center
 Harper University Hospital

Hospitals in Detroit
Midtown Detroit
Teaching hospitals in Michigan
Wayne State University
Detroit Medical Center
Tenet Healthcare